The 1996 Kansas Jayhawks football team represented the University of Kansas as a member of the North Division of the Big 12 Conference during the 1996 NCAA Division I-A football season. Led by ninth-year head coach Glen Mason, the Jayhawks compiled an overall record of 4–7 with a mark of 2–6 in conference play, placing fifth in the Big 12's North Division. The team played home games at Memorial Stadium in Lawrence, Kansas.

1996 was the Jayhawks' first season in the newly-formed Big 12, which was formed from the eight schools from Big Eight Conference and four schools from Southwest Conference (SWC); both conferences dissolved following the 1995–96 academic year. Mason resigned at the end of the season to become the head football coach at the University of Minnesota.

Schedule

Rankings

References

Kansas
Kansas Jayhawks football seasons
Kansas Jayhawks football